is a professional Japanese baseball player. He plays infielder for the Hiroshima Toyo Carp.

External links

NPB.com

1989 births
Living people
Japanese baseball players
Hiroshima Toyo Carp players
Nippon Professional Baseball infielders
Nippon Professional Baseball left fielders
Baseball people from Kitakyushu